Søren Reese (born 29 July 1993) is a Danish professional footballer who plays for Norwegian club FK Haugesund, as a centre-back.

Career

Jammerbugt FC
Reese started his career at the local club Ingstrup SF, before he joined Blokhus FC at the age of 16, which in 2013 became Jammerbugt FC. A few months after his arrival from Ingstrup SF, he made his debut in the Danish 2nd Division for Jammerbugt at the age of only 16. In June 2014, Reese went on a trial at Viborg FF, but returned to Jammerbugt in the following week.

Viborg FF
6 months after a trial at Viborg FF, the club confirmed in December 2014, that they had signed the player on a 2,5-year contract.

FC Midtjylland
On 13 June 2018, Reese joined FC Midtjylland on a 5-year contract and was immediately loaned out to AC Horsens. On 16 January 2020, he was loaned out again, this time to Esbjerg fB for the rest of the season.

He went on his third loan spell in August 2020, joining Polish Ekstraklasa club Zagłębie Lubin for the 2020-21 season. However, Reese got no playing time at the Polish club and for that reason, the loan deal was terminated on 10 January 2021 and Reese returned to Denmark, where he instead returned to AC Horsens on a loan deal for the rest of the season. On 31 August 2021, he joined SønderjyskE on loan for the rest of 2021.

Haugesund
On 14 February 2022, Reese moved to Norwegian Eliteserien club FK Haugesund on a deal until the end of 2024.

References

1993 births
Living people
Danish men's footballers
Danish expatriate men's footballers
Association football defenders
People from Jammerbugt Municipality
Jammerbugt FC players
Viborg FF players
FC Midtjylland players
AC Horsens players
Esbjerg fB players
Zagłębie Lubin players
SønderjyskE Fodbold players
FK Haugesund players
Danish 1st Division players
Danish Superliga players
Eliteserien players
Danish expatriate sportspeople in Poland
Danish expatriate sportspeople in Norway
Expatriate footballers in Poland
Expatriate footballers in Norway
Sportspeople from the North Jutland Region